= BrooWaha =

American citizen journalism and social bookmarking website

- Website type: Web publishing
- Owner: BrooWaha LLC
- Creator: BrooWaha LLC
- CEO: Amit Kumawat
- Website: www.broowaha.com
- Commercial: Yes
- Registration: Optional
- Launched: September 2006

BrooWaha is an online newspaper with a wiki-style structure for publishing articles. The articles published on the website are written by registered users.

== Overview ==
Several local editions of BrooWaha were launched for a number of major U.S. cities. The content of all these editions was aggregated in the main BrooWaha website. By 2013, all local editions were defunct and redirected to the main site.

The website was featured in the Los Angeles Times in December 2006.
